is a former Japanese football player. He played for the Japan national team.

Club career
Kato was born in Nagoya on December 22, 1958. After graduating from Hosei University, he joined the Japan Soccer League's Division 2 club Toshiba in 1981. The club won the 1981 JSL Cup. However, he left the club due to an injury in 1983. In 1985, he joined the Division 1 club All Nippon Airways.

National team career
On August 30, 1981, Kato debuted for Japan national team against Malaysia. On September 3, he scored a goal against India. He played 3 games and scored 1 goal for Japan in 1981.

National team statistics

References

External links
 
 Japan National Football Team Database

1958 births
Living people
Hosei University alumni
Association football people from Aichi Prefecture
Japanese footballers
Japan international footballers
Japan Soccer League players
Hokkaido Consadole Sapporo players
Yokohama Flügels players
Association football midfielders
Association football forwards